Rex Hazlewood may be:

 Rex Hazlewood, official with the Scout Association
 Rex Hazlewood, Australian architect
 , Australian photographer